Kotyli or Kotili (Greek: Κοτύλη or Κωτίλι) may refer to several places in Greece:

Kotyli, a community in the Xanthi regional unit
Kotili, Arcadia, a village in Arcadia 
Kotyli, Kastoria, a village in the Kastoria regional unit
Kotili, Kilkis, a settlement in the Kilkis regional unit

Kotili may also refer to:
 Kotili, Democratic Republic of the Congo, a village in Bas-Uele Province